Marcos Renan de Mattos Ceschin (born 12 May 1985 in Curitiba), or simply Renan,  is a Brazilian attacking midfielder for Panachaiki. Renan is a player who wherever he goes conquest fans.

Renan previously played for Coritiba, Paraná, Ponte Preta, Panachaiki, Pontevedra FC and Deportivo Anzoátegui.

Titles

 Campeonato Paranaense: 2003, 2004, 2005, 2006, 2007
 Campeonato Paulista: 2008 Vice- Campeão

Contract
16 January 2007 to 16 August 2008

References

External links

placar

1985 births
Living people
Brazilian footballers
Coritiba Foot Ball Club players
Paraná Clube players
Association football midfielders
Footballers from Curitiba